Masticophis flagellum is a species of nonvenomous colubrid snake, commonly referred to as the coachwhip or the whip snake, which is endemic to the United States and Mexico. Six subspecies are recognized, including the nominotypical subspecies.

Taxonomy

Etymology
The subspecific name, ruddocki, is in honor of Dr. John C. Ruddock who was Medical Director for the Richfield Oil Corporation.

Subspecies
Six subspecies of Masticophis flagellum are recognized as being valid, including the nominotypical subspecies.
Masticophis flagellum cingulum  – Sonoran coachwhip
Masticophis flagellum flagellum  – eastern coachwhip

Masticophis flagellum lineatulus  – lined coachwhip
Masticophis flagellum piceus  – red coachwhip, red racer
Masticophis flagellum ruddocki  – San Joaquin coachwhip
Masticophis flagellum testaceus  – western coachwhip

Nota bene: A trinomial authority in parentheses indicates that the subspecies was originally described in a genus other than Masticophis.

Description

Coachwhips are thin-bodied snakes with small heads and large eyes with round pupils. They vary greatly in color, but most reflect a proper camouflage for their natural habitat. M. f. testaceus is typically a shade of light brown with darker brown flecking, but in the western area of Texas, where the soil color is a shade of pink, the coachwhips are also pink in color. M. f. piceus was given its common name because specimens frequently, but not always, have some red in their coloration. Coachwhip scales are patterned so at first glance, the snake appears braided. Subspecies can be difficult to distinguish in areas where their ranges overlap.

Distribution and habitat
Coachwhips range throughout the southern United States from coast to coast. They are also found in the northern half of Mexico.

Coachwhips are commonly found in open areas with sandy soil, open pine forests, old fields, and prairies. They thrive in sandhill scrub and coastal dunes.

Behavior
Coachwhips are diurnal, and actively hunt and eat lizards, small birds, and rodents. Coachwhips subdue prey by grasping and holding them with their jaws and do not use constriction. They tend to be sensitive to potential threats, and often bolt at the first sign of one, and will readily strike if cornered. Their bites can be painful, but generally are harmless unless they become infected, as is the case with any wound. They are curious snakes with good eyesight, and are sometimes seen raising their heads above the level of the grass or rocks to see what is around them. They are extremely fast-moving snakes, able to move up to 4 miles per hour.

Myths

The primary myth concerning coachwhips, that they chase people, likely arises from the snake and the person both being frightened, and both just happening to be going the same way to escape. Coachwhips are fast snakes, often moving faster than a human, and thus give an impression of aggression should they move toward the person.

The legend of the hoop snake may refer to the coachwhip snakes.

Another myth of the rural southeastern United States is of a snake that, when disturbed, would chase a person down, wrap him up in its coils, whip him to death with its tail, and then make sure he is dead by sticking its tail up the victim's nose to see if he is still breathing. In actuality, coachwhips are neither constrictors (snakes that dispatch their prey by suffocating with their coils) nor strong enough to overpower a person. Also, they do not whip with their tails, even though their tails are long and look very much like a whip.

In parts of Mexico, where ranching is a way of life, these snakes are believed to wrap around the legs of cows and feed on their milk as if suckling leaving the nipple dry. They will also hook on any other mammal that produces milk, leaving the young baby dehydrated.

Ranchers also tell stories of chirrioneras, which hypnotize women then latch onto their breasts to feed. If the woman has a crying hungry baby, the snake sticks its tail in the baby's mouth to keep the baby quiet while feeding, then leaves, undetected. This leaves the baby malnourished and getting weaker while the mother can't feed her baby because her breasts have been sucked dry. The story goes that the only way to know if the snake has been there is if the baby has sores around the mouth.

In 1888, a farmer near Orlando, Florida is said to have seen a sixteen foot coachwhip with a head four inches wide. After seeing the snake swallow a rabbit the man moved forward to shoot, when the snake reared its head as high as a person and "began racing back and forth towards him'.

Gallery

References

External links

"Common Snake Myths". Austin Reptile Service.
"The Red Coachwhip".

Further reading
Behler, John L.; King, F. Wayne (1979). The Audubon Society Field Guide to North American Reptiles and Amphibians. New York: Alfred A. Knopf. 743 pp., 657 plates. . (Masticophis flagellum, pp. 328–329 + Plates 469, 491, 553-554, 556, 558).
Boulenger GA (1893). Catalogue of the Snakes in the British Museum (Natural History). Volume I., Containing the Families ... Colubridæ Aglyphæ, part. London: Trustees of the British Museum (Natural History). (Taylor and Francis Printers). xiii + 448 pp. + Plates I-XXVIII. (Zamenis flagelliformis, pp. 389–390).
Conant, Roger; Bridges, William (1939). What Snake Is That? A Field Guide to the Snakes of the United States East of the Rocky Mountains. (With 108 drawings by Edmond Malnate). New York and London: D. Appleton-Century Company. Frontispiece map + 163 pp. + Plates A-C, 1-32. (Masticophis flagellum, pp. 47–50 + Plate 6, figures 17-18).
Goin, Coleman J.; Goin, Olive B.; Zug, George R. (1978). Introduction to Herpetology, Third Edition. San Francisco: W.H. Freeman and Company. xi + 378 pp. . (Masticophis flagellum, p. 129).
Schmidt, Karl P.; Davis, D. Dwight (1941). Field Book of Snakes of the United States and Canada. New York: G.P. Putnam's Sons. 365 pp., 34 plates, 103 figures. (Coluber flagellum, pp. 127–131 + Figure 29 on p. 122 + Plate 13).
Shaw G (1802). General Zoology, or Systematic Natural History, Vol. III., Part II. London: G. Kearsley. vii + pp. 313–615. (Coluber flagellum, new species,  p. 475).
Smith, Hobart M.; Brodie, Edmund D., Jr. (1982). Reptiles of North America: A Guide to Field Identification. New York: Golden Press. 240 pp.  (paperback),  (hardcover). (Masticophis flagellum, pp. 192–193).
Wright, Albert Hazen; Wright, Anna Allen (1957). Handbook of Snakes of the United States and Canada. Ithaca and London: Comstock Publishing Associates, a division of Cornell University Press. 1,105 pp. (in two volumes). (Masticophis flagellum, pp. 432–450, Figures 130-133, Map 37).

Colubrids
Snakes of North America
Reptiles of Mexico
Reptiles of the United States
Taxa named by George Shaw
Reptiles described in 1802